Arbejdernes Landsbank is a Danish bank founded in 1919 with approximately 250,000 customers and 1,075 employees. It is the 7th largest bank in Denmark. As of 2014 the bank has 70 branches in Denmark.

History
The bank was founded by Danish trade unions, the Social Democrats and Arbejderkul (union of coal workers) with an initial capital of DKK 2 million, most of which was pledged by Arbejderkul, who were particularly powerful after performing a crucial role in securing Denmark's energy supply during World War I. Although the bank was officially a public company, the shares could not be listed and remained with the labour movement. In practice the bank operated as a cooperative.

During the great depression, major shareholder Arbejderkul ran into trouble and the trade union federation joined the ownership of the bank. In the 1960s the bank went through a major growth period, attracting new private customers and many independent branches were opened throughout Denmark.

As of 2014, the bank has 24,000 private shareholders, although the trade unions remain the major shareholders.

Customer satisfaction
In customer satisfaction studies among Danish banks, Arbejdernes Landsbank is consistently ranked as the highest rated bank.

Sponsorships
AL is one of the main sponsors of the Danish women's national handball team. On 1 July 2016 AL became the principal sponsor of the football side Brøndby IF in a four-year deal. AL sponsors shirts for AGF and FC Midtjylland and has been a Super Partner of FC Nordsjælland since July 2011.

AL is also sponsoring Giv Håb, an organisation that supports children who experience serious disease or death in their immediate family. AL supports Danish film as a sponsor of the "Bag om filmen"-programme.

References

External links
Bank Profile: Arbejdernes Landsbank

Banks of Denmark
Financial services companies based in Copenhagen
Companies based in Copenhagen Municipality
Banks established in 1919
Danish companies established in 1919
Labour movement in Denmark